Andrew Michael "Handy Andy" Phillip (March 7, 1922 – April 29, 2001) was an American professional basketball player. Born in Granite City, Illinois, Phillip had an 11-year career and played for the Chicago Stags of the Basketball Association of America and the Philadelphia Warriors, Fort Wayne Pistons and Boston Celtics, of the National Basketball Association (NBA).

High school/College
Phillip led his high school in Granite City, Illinois, to the IHSA state championship in 1940 by defeating Herrin High School with a final score of 24–22 at Huff Gym on the University of Illinois at Urbana–Champaign campus. Ironically it would be that same gymnasium where he earned renown for his talents and for the Fighting Illini's success during war-interrupted, non-consecutive seasons in 1941–1943 and 1946–1947. Phillip was the untitled leader of "The Whiz Kids", a team that included Ken Menke, Gene Vance, Jack Smiley and team captain Art Mathisen. Arguably the most talented basketball team in the nation, Phillip and his teammates would elect not to participate in either the NCAA or NIT tournament based on the army's draft of Mathisen, Menke and Smiley. The team was retroactively named the national champion by the Premo-Porretta Power Poll. Four of the five, minus Mathisen, returned to Illinois and tried to recapture the glory for one more season in 1946–47 after the war ended, but the chemistry had changed as well as their talent. Illinois went 14–6.

While attending Illinois, Phillip was a member of Delta Tau Delta fraternity. Phillip served as a first lieutenant in the United States Marine Corps in World War II at Iwo Jima.

Professional basketball
Phillip played in the first five NBA All-Star Games, and was twice named to the All-NBA Second Team. He was the first player to record 500 assists in a season, and led the NBA in assists during the 1950–51 and 1951–52 seasons. Phillip reached the postseason every year he was in the league, and his teams made it to the NBA Finals during his final four seasons — twice with Fort Wayne and twice with Boston. The 1957 Boston team won the NBA Championship.

Phillip was alleged by one of his Fort Wayne Pistons teammates, George Yardley, to have conspired with gamblers to throw the 1955 NBA Finals to the Syracuse Nationals. In the decisive seventh game, Phillip turned the ball over with three seconds remaining in the game, enabling Syracuse to win by one point, 92–91.

After retiring from playing basketball, he coached the St. Louis Hawks for 10 games in 1958, posting a 6–4 record before he was fired. Phillip later coached the Chicago Majors of the American Basketball League.

Phillip was elected to the Naismith Memorial Basketball Hall of Fame in 1961. He was elected to the Illini Men's Basketball All-Century Team in 2004. In 2007, Phillip was voted one of the "100 Legends of the IHSA Boys Basketball Tournament", recognizing his superior performance in his appearance in the tournament.

Phillip died at his home in Rancho Mirage, California, on April 29, 2001, aged 79.

Sports writer Dan Manoyan wrote a book about Phillip and his Granite City High School basketball teammates, titled Men of Granite, in 2007. A film based on the book, directed by Dwayne Johnson-Cochran, began production in 2015.

Honors

Basketball
 1942, 1943, 1947 – First-team All-Big Ten
 1942 & 1943 First Team All-American
 1943 – National Player of the Year
 1943 – Sporting News National Player of the Year
 1943 – Big Ten Player of the Year
 1961 – Inducted into the Naismith Memorial Basketball Hall of Fame
 1973 – Inducted into the Illinois Basketball Coaches Association's Hall of Fame as a player.
 2004 – Elected to the "Illini Men's Basketball All-Century Team".
 2006 – Inducted into the National Collegiate Basketball Hall of Fame
 2007 – Named one of the 100 Legends of the IHSA Boys Basketball Tournament.
 September 13, 2008 – Honored as one of the 34 honored jerseys which hang in the State Farm Center to show regard for being the most decorated basketball players in the University of Illinois' history.

Baseball
 1947 – Baseball All-American (First baseman)

Athletics
 1942, 1943 – University of Illinois Athlete of the Year
 2017 – Inducted into the Illinois Athletics Hall of Fame

Statistics

Basketball

BAA/NBA career statistics

Regular season

Playoffs

Head coaching record

|-
| style="text-align:left;"|St. Louis
| style="text-align:left;"|1958–59
|10||6||4|||| style="text-align:center;"|(fired)|||—||—||—||—
| style="text-align:center;"|—
|- class="sortbottom"
| style="text-align:left;"|Total
| ||10||6||4|||||| —||—||—||—||

References

External links

 
 BasketballReference.com: Andy Phillip (as player)
 BasketballReference.com: Andy Phillip (as coach)
 

1922 births
2001 deaths
All-American college baseball players
All-American college men's basketball players
Amateur Athletic Union men's basketball players
American Basketball League (1961–62) coaches
American men's basketball coaches
American men's basketball players
Basketball coaches from Illinois
Basketball players from Illinois
Battle of Iwo Jima
Boston Celtics players
Chicago Stags draft picks
Chicago Stags players
Fort Wayne Pistons players
Illinois Fighting Illini baseball players
Illinois Fighting Illini men's basketball players
Naismith Memorial Basketball Hall of Fame inductees
National Basketball Association All-Stars
National Collegiate Basketball Hall of Fame inductees
People from Granite City, Illinois
Philadelphia Warriors players
Point guards
Shooting guards
Sportspeople from Greater St. Louis
St. Louis Hawks head coaches
United States Marine Corps officers
United States Marine Corps personnel of World War II
Military personnel from Illinois